GPAA may refer to:
Gold Prospectors Association of America
Greater Pibor Administrative Area in South Sudan